Ted Elliott (24 May 1919 – September 1984) was an English footballer, who played as a goalkeeper in the Football League for Wolverhampton Wanderers, Chester and Halifax Town.

References

Chester City F.C. players
Wolverhampton Wanderers F.C. players
Halifax Town A.F.C. players
Association football goalkeepers
English Football League players
Carlisle United F.C. players
1919 births
1984 deaths
Footballers from Carlisle, Cumbria
English footballers